The Gezi Party was an environmentalist political party in Turkey founded on 1 October 2013 and became defunct as of 23 October 2017.
The party was named after 2013 protests in Turkey, since the protests usually named as "Gezi Protests" in Turkish media. The founder Reşit Cem Köksal is an ex-heavy metal guitarist from İstanbul.

The logo of the party is a tree with a man figure on its trunk and roots.

References

2013 establishments in Turkey
Centrist parties in Turkey
Environmentalism in Turkey
Gezi Park protests
Political parties established in 2013
Political parties in Turkey